The Negros Occidental Football Association is a Filipino football association based in Bacolod. It works under the Philippine Football Federation as provincial football association for the Negros Occidental area. The president of the association is Ricardo Yanson Jr since January 30, 2015. San Carlos, Negros Occidental mayor, Gerardo Valmayor Jr. is Yanson's Vice President. Yanson seceded Carlos Cojuangco as president.

Structure

Affiliated Clubs

Bago City FC
Cadiz City FC
Ceres FC
Dancalan Ilog FC
Don Bosco FC
Escalante FC
Himamaylan City FC
Kabankalan FC
La Carlota FC
Ma-ao FC
Minuluan FC
Pontevedra FC
Sagay City FC
San Carlos FC
Victorias City FC

Officials

Competitions
The future of Philippine football relies on the implementation of its grassroots program and the country’s inclusion in the FIFA Council is seen to help improve and boost it a little more.

 NOFA 12 and Under Invitational Cup
 Dynamic Football League

References

Football governing bodies in the Philippines
Sports in Negros Occidental